Paul Hopgood (born 21 July 1973) is a former Australian rules footballer who played with Melbourne in the Australian Football League (AFL).

Hopgood, a defender, started out at Melbourne in the under-19s and captained the Victorian Teal Cup team in 1990. The Chelsea recruit played 113 league games for Melbourne over the course of eight seasons. His six games in 1994 included three finals. When Melbourne made the grand final in 2000, Hopgood had lost his place in the side, due to a calf injury. He coached Mt Eliza to a premiership in 2005.

References

1973 births
People educated at Haileybury (Melbourne)
Australian rules footballers from Victoria (Australia)
Melbourne Football Club players
Chelsea Football Club (Australia) players
Living people